

Iacov Sucevan (1869 – 26 March 1929) was a Bessarabian politician.

Biography 

He served as Member of the Moldovan Parliament (1917–1918).

Gallery

Bibliography 
Gheorghe E. Cojocaru, Sfatul Țării: itinerar, Civitas, Chişinău, 1998, 
Mihai Taşcă, Sfatul Țării şi actualele authorităţi locale, "Timpul de dimineaţă", no. 114 (849), June 27, 2008 (page 16)

References

External links 
 Arhiva pentru Sfatul Tarii
 Deputaţii Sfatului Ţării şi Lavrenti Beria

Romanian people of Moldovan descent
1869 births
1929 deaths
Moldovan MPs 1917–1918